Sam Brown III, usually known by his first and last name without the generational appellation, is an American songwriter, record producer, arranger and composer working in Los Angeles. He is noted for involvement in nine No.1 records, six No. 1 singles, ten RIAA Gold Record achievements, often performing multiple roles such as songwriter and producer. Brown plays drums. He is a strings and horn arranger/conductor. Sam Brown's public career in music spans more than two and a half decades, and features involvement in hit song and hit album productions, as well as writing, arranging and conducting for film and TV. He hosts and produces radio programs about the business of entertainment, specifically music for film, television and radio, etc. on Los Angeles-based radio station KPFK FM.

Advice programs and columns (Radio and Print) 
 "Samm Brown's For the Record" weekly 1-hour radio program on KPFK FM, North Hollywood, California.
Archived...
 "Learn the Craft of Songwriting" in the Tolucan Times, a Toluca Lake, California newspaper.

References

External links 
 http://www.sbrownkpfk.com 

Living people
Songwriters from California
Writers from Los Angeles
Year of birth missing (living people)